Jefferson Township is one of the twenty-seven townships of Ashtabula County, Ohio, United States. The 2010 census found 5,252 people in the township, 2,132 of whom lived in the unincorporated portions of the township.

Geography
Located in the central part of the county, it borders the following townships:
Plymouth Township - north
Sheffield Township - northeast corner
Denmark Township - east
Dorset Township - southeast corner
Lenox Township - south
Morgan Township - southwest corner
Austinburg Township - west
Saybrook Township - northwest corner

The village of Jefferson, the county seat of Ashtabula County, is located in central Jefferson Township.

Name and history
It is one of twenty-four Jefferson Townships statewide.

The township was first settled in 1805 by former Connecticut resident Michael Webster.

Government
The township is governed by a three-member board of trustees, who are elected in November of odd-numbered years to a four-year term beginning on the following January 1. Two are elected in the year after the presidential election and one is elected in the year before it. There is also an elected township fiscal officer, who serves a four-year term beginning on April 1 of the year after the election, which is held in November of the year before the presidential election. Vacancies in the fiscal officership or on the board of trustees are filled by the remaining trustees.  Currently, the board is composed of chairwoman Charlene Kusar and members Martha Demshar and John Wayman.

References

External links
Jefferson Area Chamber of Commerce
County website

Townships in Ashtabula County, Ohio
Townships in Ohio